The Han Zhao emperor Liu Cong, after his third wife Empress Liu E's death in 314, became involved in the unorthodox practice of creating multiple empresses, against the Chinese tradition of having one empress at one time. Several women therefore carried the empress titles during his late reign, either entirely simultaneously or in an overlapping manner, and four of them survived to the time of the brief reign of his son Liu Can in 318. Liu Can was said to have engaged in affairs with all of them (which was considered incest under Chinese tradition, even though he had no blood relations with them), all of whom were described as younger than 20 in age. In addition to these empresses with formal titles, Liu Cong was said to have had several other consorts who also carried empress seals, but not official empress titles.

Jin Yueguang
Jin Yueguang (靳月光) was Jin Zhun's daughter, and she became a consort of Liu Cong's in 315, along with her sister Jin Yuehua, and was created "Upper Empress" (上皇后).  She was described to be extremely beautiful.  Later that year, Liu Cong's official Chen Yuanda revealed that she had an affair, and Liu Cong felt that he had no choice but to depose her.  She committed suicide in shame, and Liu Cong, missing her beauty, became resentful of Chen from that point on.

Left Empress Liu
Left Empress Liu (劉左皇后, personal name unknown) was likely a granddaughter of the respected Han Zhao official Liu Yin (劉殷) and niece of Empress Liu E.  She was created "Left Empress" in 315, and nothing further is known about her.  She was not mentioned when Liu Can became emperor in 318, and Liu Cong had earlier in 318 created another Left Empress, implying that she was dead by that point.

Jin Yuehua
Jin Yuehua (靳月華) was Jin Zhun's daughter, and she became a consort of Liu Cong's in 315, along with her sister Jin Yueguang, and was created "Right Empress" (右皇后).  She was described to be extremely beautiful.  She survived to Liu Can's reign in 318, when Liu Can honored her as empress dowager.  It is not known what her fate was after her father Jin Zhun overthrew Liu Can later in 318 and was subsequently assassinated and succeeded by his cousin Jin Ming (靳明), who, along with the entire Jin clan, was massacred by the succeeding emperor Liu Yao.

Upper Empress Fan
Upper Empress Fan (樊上皇后, personal name unknown) was a servant girl of Liu Cong's second wife Empress Zhang Huiguang.  She was created "Upper Empress" in 316. When Liu Can became emperor in 318, he honored her as "Empress Hongdao" (弘道皇后).

Left Empress Wang
Left Empress Wang (王左皇后, personal name unknown) was an adopted daughter of the eunuch Wang Chen (王沈), a trusted but corrupt assistant to Liu Cong.  Several officials tried to persuade him from creating a eunuch's adopted daughter (whom they saw as no higher, social station-wise, than a servant girl) an empress, and they were executed for their opposition.  When Liu Cong died later that year and was succeeded by Liu Can, she was honored as "Empress Hongxiao" (弘孝皇后).

Middle Empress Xuan
Middle Empress Xuan (宣中皇后, personal name unknown) was an adopted daughter of the eunuch Xuan Huai (宣懷), a trusted but corrupt assistant to Liu Cong.  She was created "Middle Empress" in 318 after Liu Cong had already executed several officials over his creating Left Empress Wang, and so she appeared to have received no additional opposition.  When Liu Cong died later that year and was succeeded by Liu Can, she was honored as "Empress Hongde" (弘德皇后).

315 deaths
Suicides in China
Former Zhao empresses
4th-century Chinese women
4th-century Chinese people
Lists of royal mistresses
Year of birth unknown
Ancient people who committed suicide